Richmond Hill Public Library may refer to:

Richmond Hill Public Library, in Richmond Hill, Ontario, Canada.
Richmond Hill Public Library, a branch of the Statesboro Regional Public Libraries in Georgia.